Mera is a community of Tulu Nadu, India, an indigenous people mainly spread in the areas of modern Kasaragod District of Kerala and Mangalore, Udupi, Coorg Districts of Karnataka. They follow a matriarchal family system called as "Bari". The Language spoken by Mera is Tulu.

Ethnic groups in India